The 1925 Big Ten Conference football season was the 30th season of college football played by the member schools of the Big Ten Conference (also known as the Western Conference) and was a part of the 1925 college football season. Over the course of the season, Big Ten teams played 36 non-conference games, compiling a 27–9 record (.750) in those games.

The 1925 Big Ten Conference champion was Michigan. The team compiled a 7–1 record, shut out seven opponents, and outscored opponents by a combined score of 227 to 3. The only points allowed by the team were in a 3 to 2 loss to Northwestern in a game played in a heavy rainstorm on a field covered in mud five or six inches deep in some places. Quarterback Benny Friedman and left end Bennie Oosterbaan, sometimes referred to as "The Benny-to-Bennie Show," were both consensus All-Americans and became known as one of the greatest passing combinations in college football history.

Northwestern's center, Tim Lowry, won the Chicago Tribune Silver Football trophy as the Big Ten's most valuable player. Lowry received 23 votes; Benny Friedman of Michigan finished second with 18 votes. Four Big Ten players were consensus picks for the 1925 All-America team:Benny Friedman of Michigan at quarterback; Red Grange of Illinois at halfback; Bennie Oosterbaan of Michigan at end; and Ed Hess of Ohio State at guard.

Season overview

Results and team statistics

Key
PPG = Average of points scored per game
PAG = Average of points allowed per game

Regular season

October 3
All 10 conference teams opened their seasons on October 3, playing 10 games against non-conference opponents, resulting in eight wins and two losses.

October 10
On October 10, the conference teams played two intra-conference games and six non-conference games. The non-conference games resulted in six victories and no losses.

October 17
On October 17, the conference teams played three intra-conference games and four non-conference games. The non-conference games resulted in three victories and one loss.

October 24
On October 24, the conference teams played three intra-conference games and four non-conference games. The non-conference games resulted in one victory and three losses.

October 31
On October 31, the conference teams played three intra-conference games and four non-conference games. The non-conference games resulted in four victories and no losses.

November 7
On November 7, the conference teams played four intra-conference games and two non-conference games. The non-conference games resulted in two victories and no losses.

November 14
On November 14, the conference teams played three intra-conference games and four non-conference games. The non-conference games resulted in three victories and one loss.

November 21
On November 21, the conference teams played four intra-conference games and two non-conference games. The non-conference games resulted in two losses.

Bowl games
No Big Ten teams participated in any bowl games during the 1925 season.

All-Big Ten players

The following players were picked by multiple selectors as first-team players on the 1925 All-Big Ten Conference football team. Players selected as first-team players by all seven selectors are shown in bold.

 Bennie Oosterbaan, end, Michigan (AP, BE, BTW, NB, JW, UP, WE)
 Chuck Kassel, end, Illinois (AP, BE, BTW, UP, WE)
 Dick Romey, end, Iowa (JW, NB)
 Fred "Bub" Henderson, tackle, Chicago (AP, BE, BTW, JW, NB, UP, WE)
 Tom Edwards, tackle, Michigan (BTW, NB, UP, WE)
 Harry Hawkins, tackle, Michigan (AP, BE, BTW, JW)
 Ed Hess, guard, Ohio State (AP, BE, BTW, JW, NB, UP, WE)
 Bernie Shively, guard, Illinois (AP, BE, JW)
 Robert J. Brown, center/guard, Michigan (AP, BE, BTW, JW, NB, UP)
 Tim Lowry, Northwestern (BTW, UP, WE)
 Benny Friedman, quarterback, Michigan (AP, BE, BTW, JW, UP, WE)
 Red Grange, halfback, Illinois (AP, BE, BTW, NB, JW, UP, WE)
 Austin McCarty, halfback/fullback, Chicago (AP, BE, BTW, WE)
 Loren L. Lewis, fullback, Northwestern (AP, UP)

All-Americans

Four Big Ten players were consensus first-team selections to the 1925 College Football All-America Team:
 Bennie Oosterbaan, end, Michigan (AAB, AP, COL, FW, INS, NEA, UP, A&S, BE, NB, RKN, Sun, WC, WE)
 Ed Hess, guard, Ohio State (COL, LIB, NEA, UP, A&S, BE, NB, HR)
 Benny Friedman, quarterback, Michigan (AAB, LIB, UP, RKN, Sun, SW)
 Red Grange, halfback, Illinois (AP, COL, FW, INS, LIB, NEA, UP, A&S, BE, HR, NB, RKN, Sun, SW, WC, WE)

Other Big Ten players receiving first-team honors from at least one selector included:

 Dick Romey, end, Iowa (LIB)
 Cookie Cunningham, end, Ohio State (HR)
 Harry Hawkins, tackle, Michigan (FW)
 Tom Edwards, tackle, Michigan (WE)
 Fred "Bub" Henderson, tackle, Chicago (NB)
 Merwin Mitterwallner, guard, Illinois (HR)
 Robert Brown, center, Michigan (INS, LIB, NEA, A&S, BE, NB, SW)
 Tim Lowry, center, Northwestern (FW)

References